Domentijan (c. 1210 - after 1264), also known as Domentijan the Hilandarian (Доментијан Хиландарац), was a major figure in medieval Serbian literature and philosophy. He was a monk of the Hilandar Monastery and a contemporary of Saint Sava. In fact, he accompanied St. Sava on his visit to the Holy Land. He was highly respected by both the royal court and the monks of Mount Athos. The Athonite scribe Teodore's account of his troubles, recorded on the pages of the Hexameron (Šestodnev) of John the Exarch, which Teodore copied at Domentijan's request, contains many references to Domentijan's humanity and the help he gave him. The manuscript is now in the State Historical Museum in Moscow.

It can be concluded that Domentijan was essentially a hymnologist who wrote biographies of two Serbian saints, but in fact glorified monasticism and Christianity.

Biography of St. Sava
Domentijan's biography of St. Sava, written around 1253 (and an earlier one of St. Simeon Nemanja), was expressly commissioned by the royal court of King Stefan Uroš I, seven years after Sava's death. It is an account of the life of St. Sava, but it is also an apotheosis of monasticism. Domentijan's style is characterized by fluent narration, panegyric diction, an abundance of theological and mystical elements with an emphasis on a spiritual and clearly monastic point of view. Domentijan wrote it in the kellion (cell) built by Sava in Karyes, the Athonite seat.

Biography of St. Simeon
For his biography of St. Simeon, Domentijan used material from the works of earlier authors, unintentionally preserving some of them to the present day. He drew freely from the biography of Stefan Nemanja by Stefan the First-Crowned, a third of his own biography of St. Sava, and in the Panegyric to St. Simeon he used a few lines from Ilarion's Panegyric to St. Vladimir.

Legacy
He is included in The 100 most prominent Serbs. Đura Daničić published Domentijan's texts in Belgrade in 1865. The Serbian Literary Guild adapted them to the modern language in 1938.

See also
 John the Deacon
 Teodosije
 Danilo II, Serbian Archbishop
 Stefan Dušan
 Elder Siluan
 Teodosije the Hilandarian (1246-1328), one of the most important Serbian writers in the Middle Ages, and the next great Athonite in the Serbian literature of the 13th century.
 Elder Grigorije (fl. 1310-1355), builder of Saint Archangels Monastery
 Antonije Bagaš (fl. 1356-1366), bought and restored the Agiou Pavlou monastery
 Lazar the Hilandarian (fl. 1404), the first known Serbian and Russian watchmaker
 Pachomius the Serb (fl. 1440s-1484), hagiographer of the Russian Church
 Miroslav Gospel
 Gabriel the Hilandarian
 Constantine of Kostenets
 Cyprian, Metropolitan of Kiev and All Rus'
 Gregory Tsamblak
 Isaija the Monk
 Grigorije of Gornjak
 Radoslav's Gospel (Inok of Dalša)
 Rajčin Sudić
 Romylos of Vidin
 Marko Pećki
 Grigorije Vasilije
 Danilo III (patriarch)
 Anonymous Athonite

References

Sources
  (old Serbian)

1210 births
13th-century deaths
Year of birth uncertain
Year of death unknown
13th-century Serbian writers
Medieval Serbian Orthodox clergy
Medieval Athos
People of the Kingdom of Serbia (medieval)
13th-century Eastern Orthodox clergy
Hagiographers
Medieval European scribes
13th-century Christian monks
People associated with Hilandar Monastery